Somali International University (SIU) is a private non-profit community owned university located in Mogadishu, Somalia.

Overview
The university has six faculties. Each faculty has several departments. SIU offers over 30 degree programs at undergraduate and postgraduate level. The postgraduate programs are in collaboration with Kenyatta University.

Faculties

Faculty of Medicine and Health Sciences  
Departments

 General Medicine and Surgery
 General nursing 
 Nursing and midwifery 
 Medical Laboratory Science 
 Public Health

Faculty of Business and Economics 
Departments

 Business Administration 
 Accounting & Finance 
 Accounting 
 Banking and Finance 
 Business Information Systems 
 Economics 
 Economics and Statistics 
 Economics

Faculty of Engineering and Computer Technology 

 Computer Science
 Civil Engineering

Faculty of Arts and Social Sciences 
Departments

 Politics and International Relations 
 Public Administration and Leadership
 Politics and Government Studies 3
 Criminology and Media Studies 
 Journalism and Media Studies

Faculty of Sharia and Law 
Departments
 Sharia
 Sharia and Law 
 Secular Law

SIU Academic System 

Somali International University academic year is divided into two semesters and a summer session. A semester lasts approximately 16 weeks.

Partnerships 
SIU has a very active International Office that has seen the University through its many partnerships with leading universities within East Africa. Today, over 50 of SIU medical students spend up to one year in Uganda and Kenya for their final year of medical school. The International Office is headed by Dr. Okello Andrew, a Ugandan medical doctor who was also among the first foreign medical practitioners to serve in the country. Besides the International Office, Dr. Okello is a routine medical doctor in the University's teaching hospitals. The notable universities in East Africa are; 
 Gulu University (Uganda)
 Kenyatta University (Kenya)
 Makerere University (Uganda)
 Mbarara University of Science and Technology (Uganda)
 University of Nairobi (Kenya)

Notable alumni
 Hindia Haji Mohamed, broadcast radio and TV journalist and producer

External links
Somali International University
 http://somaliinternationaluniversity.com/news-notices-and-events/27-siu-medical-students-semester-10-return-from-uganda/

Universities in Somalia
Universities in Mogadishu